The 1983 Buffalo Bills season was the franchise's 14th season in the National Football League, and the 24th overall. It was the first of three seasons for head coach Kay Stephenson. Bills running back Joe Cribbs was both the Bills' leading rusher (1131 yards), and the team's leader in receptions and receiving yards (57 catches for 524 yards). The team looked to improve on its 4–5 record from 1982. With the NFL schedule back to 16 games, the Bills were a more competitive team during 1983. The team started 5–2 through its first 7 games. However, they would struggle the rest of the way, as they went 3–6 in its final 9 games en route to a mediocre 8–8 season. This season also saw the Bills beat the Dolphins in Miami for the first time since 1966, Miami's inaugural season. After beating the Chiefs, 14–9, in Arrowhead Stadium on December 4, the Bills would lose 22 road games in a row, which included going 0–8 on the road in each of the following two seasons.

Offseason

NFL draft 

The Bills drafted future Hall of Fame quarterback Jim Kelly, the third of a record six quarterbacks taken in the first round of the 1983 draft. Kelly would play for the USFL's Houston Gamblers from 1983–1985, before making his first start with the Bills in Week One of the 1986 season. The Bills later retired Kelly's #12, at the time the only number the franchise retired. Linebacker Darryl Talley played for twelve years with the Bills. He was a two-time Pro Bowler, in 1990 and 1991. He was inducted into the Bills Wall of Fame.

Personnel

Staff

Roster

Schedule

Season summary

Week 1

Week 2

Week 3

Week 4

Week 5

Week 6

Week 7

Week 8

Week 9 

    
    
    
    
    
    
    

The Bills knocked Ken Stabler out of the game at the end of the first quarter with a rib injury.

Week 10

Week 11

Week 12

Week 13

Week 14

Week 15

Week 16

Standings

Awards and honors

All-Pros 
 Fred Smerlas, Nose tackle
 Steve Freeman, Safety

References

External links 
 1983 Buffalo Bills at Pro-Football-Reference.com

Buffalo Bills seasons
Buffalo Bills
Buffalo